The 2022–23 Arizona State Sun Devils men's ice hockey season was the 8th season of play for the program at the Division I level. The Sun Devils represented Arizona State University and were coached by Greg Powers, in his 11th season.

Season

Departures

Recruiting

Roster
As of July 18, 2022.

|}

Standings

Schedule and results

|-
!colspan=12 style=";" | Regular Season

|-
!colspan=12 style=";" |

Scoring statistics

Goaltending statistics

Rankings

References

2022-23
Arizona State Sun Devils
Arizona State Sun Devils
2023 in sports in Arizona
2022 in sports in Arizona